JS Tsushima (MSO-302) was the second ship of the s of the Japanese Maritime Self-Defense Force. She was commissioned on 23 March 1993.

Development and design 
The Maritime Self-Defense Force's transport and landing craft unit set up a fleet in 1955 with six general-purpose landing craft (LCUs) and 29 mobile landing craft (LCMs) provided by the U.S. Navy under the MSA Agreement. And. Subsequently, in 1961, based on the MSA agreement, three LST-542 class tank landing ships (LST-1 class final type) retired by the U.S. Navy were donated and started operation as Osumi type transport ships.

The three ships of the same type formed the first transport corps under the control of the Yokosuka District Force, but on May 1, 1962, they were reassigned under the direct control of the Self-Defense Fleet and engaged in maritime transport and maritime operation transport. It was an extremely practical landing ship except for the lack of speed, but all of them were built from 1944 to 1945, and since they will reach the end of their useful life in the 40's of the Showa era, an alternative ship is needed. Was there. For this reason, the design of the 1,500-ton type (45LST), which had been built for the district corps a little earlier, was expanded, and it was built as a 2,000-ton type transport ship for agile operation under the SDF fleet.

Construction and career 
She was the second minesweeper of the Maritime Self-Defense Force. The 1989 plan minesweeper No. 302 based on the medium-term defense capability development plan was laid down at the JFE Holdings on July 20, 1990, launched on September 20, 1991, and launched on March 23, 1993. It was put into service, and was incorporated into the 2nd Mine Warfare Force as a ship under direct control and deployed in Yokosuka. On March 23, the same year, the 51st Mine Warfare Force was newly formed under the 2nd Mine Warfare Force, and was incorporated with the second ship  commissioned on the same day.

On March 13, 2000, the Mine Warfare Force was reorganized due to the reorganization of the Mine Warfare Force, and the 51st Mine Warfare Force was transferred to the Mine Warfare Force.

After arriving, Japan participated in the "multilateral sweeping training co-sponsored by the United States and the United Kingdom" for the first time in the Persian Gulf off Bahrain from the 15th to the 30th of the same month. Returned to Japan on December 1.

Removed from the register on July 1, 2016. The total cruising distance was 275,396.6NM (about 13 laps of the earth), and the total voyage time was 36,849.7 hours (1536 days).

References 

Yaeyama-class minesweepers of the Japan Maritime Self-Defense Force
Ships built in Japan
1991 ships